The Bandini 1000 turbo, also known as Bandini Berlinetta is a hand-built road car, built in 1992 by engineer Ilario Bandini. The Berlinetta was his last design and represents the ultimate evolutionary step of his long career.

The design and construction of Berlinetta undertook the last six years of the life of Ilario Bandini that despite the eighty candles, as proof, once again, its continued commitment to improving technical and stylistic their "inventions". The "berlinetta" will last witness of his creative genius, its technical capabilities and skills craft.

Chassis
Built in the mid-1980s, the chassis continued to be designed along the same lines that Bandini had been using for decades.

 Structure and material: frame of mixed round and rectangular oval section tubes, special steel:
 Suspension:
 Front: Independent, triangles overlapping with shock hydraulic telescopic tilted and springs cylindrical helical coaxial; bar stabilizing, camber recordable
 Rear: Independent, triangle and lower arms swinging shock hydraulic telescopic inclined agents on the triangle lower bar stabilizing, camber, caster, and convergence recordable
 Braking system:
 Service: hydraulics, disc front and rear
 Steering:  rack and pinion
 Guide: left
 Wheels: Aluminium alloy, Bandini design
 Fuel tank: 
 Transmission: rear central differential and gearbox

Engine
The engine of the entire implementation Bandini, has undergone a lengthy testing before being acted, is the first time that an engine Bandini is equipped with turbocharger. The Bandini 1000 turbo uses indirect injection pump with mechanical, electronic ignition, a distribution chain with two trees to cammes on roller bearings that vertical command four valves per cylinder, piston head flat, titanium connecting rods and a lubrication system Carter to dry. Features that make it possible to exceed 10000 rpm. The gearbox in merger with the differential is a five-speed manual.

 Positioning: longitudinal rear, 4-cylinder in-line
 Materials and particularity: block to 5 media bench and alloy sump, DOHC alloy Head, distribution chain, 4 valves per cylinder, rods titanium, turbo with intercooler (1.4 pressure bar)
 Bore: 
 Stroke: 
 Displacement: 929 cc
 Compression ratio: 7,11:1
 Power: fuel injection mechanical valve guillotine, turbo with intercooler
 Max. speed: 10000 rpm
 Lubricate: dry sump
 Cooling: forced liquid with centrifugal pump controlled by pulley and belt, coolers at the rear
 Gearbox and clutch: 5 speed + RG clutch twin dry discs
 Ignition and electrical equipment: coil and distributor on the head with electronic, battery 12 V and alternator

Body

The two-seater bodywork in aluminium is synthesis of many Bandini resulting from the past, however, original and modern. The front part sloping, in the grid to elements horizontal and vertical  there are references to torpedo and especially Bandini 750 sport internazionale The headlights are on the disappearance like the first Bandini but seats on the front wheel just above a thin optical groups shaped and arrears compared to central air-intake thereby helping to draw to mind the car with wheels discoveries. Under the line "horizon" which cuts in half the air-intake oval, triangular openings appear and have the function to bring air disc brakes front. The lines stretched sidewall of the car recall the 1000 P's rear end but are unheard of horizontal grids on miniskirts, the doors in their top copy of the roof pillars, whose width is dictated by soft born guidelines on the edge of the bonnet front and the bottom line does not change the date by the width of the front wheels.

The windshield, very convex, is more inclined than the previous "sitting room" and slightly more content, in order to improve its aerodynamic penetration. On the rear pillars of considerable size, are integrated two long trapezoidal fins with the task of harmonising heights between roof and rear part is played by eight openings gill shark size and inclination that gradually diminish. The back window is flat and vertical while a "duck tail" rear spoiler adds character to the back, with its very wide wheels. Many louvers and vents aid in cooling the heart of the car, the Bandini 1000 Turbo engine.

The frieze with the signing Bandini stands on the rear fins, looking aluminum separable, the flying cut on dashboard decentralized, on the body, chassis and engine over. The front corner lights come from a Volvo 480 ES.

See also
 Ilario Bandini
 Bandini Cars

Bandini vehicles
Sports racing cars
Cars introduced in 1992